Ian Thornley (born July 21, 1972) is a Canadian rock guitarist, vocalist, and songwriter. He is best known for his band Big Wreck as well as Thornley, his solo project during the 2000s.

Career
Born and raised in Toronto, Ontario, Thornley studied jazz music at Boston's Berklee College of Music in the 1990s, and formed the band Big Wreck in 1993 with classmates David Henning, Brian Doherty, and Forrest Williams. They soon relocated from Boston to Toronto and eventually signed a US record deal with Atlantic Records.  Their 1997 debut album, In Loving Memory Of..., was a significant hit that year on rock radio in both Canada and the United States. Big Wreck released a follow-up in 2001 called The Pleasure and the Greed, but went on to break up in 2002.

Thornley subsequently returned to Toronto, where he played as a session musician on albums by Nickelback, Sarah Harmer and Stephen Fearing before launching a new band, Thornley, who released their first album, Come Again, in 2004. The follow-up record, Tiny Pictures, was released in Canada on February 10, 2009, via 604 Records. The album was produced and mixed by Nick Raskulinecz.  

Thornley also auditioned with Velvet Revolver for the position of their lead singer. However, this did not materialize as he did not feel comfortable being a lead singer without playing guitar. The band eventually chose Scott Weiland as their lead singer.

In the fall of 2010, Ian Thornley started touring with ex-bandmate Brian Doherty from Big Wreck. Ian had seemingly stopped calling his band "Thornley" and was touring under his full name. On November 26, 2010, they were billed as "Ian Thornley and Big Wreck" at the Edmonton Grey Cup Festival.

Ian Thornley left 604 Records in 2011 and signed with Anthem/SRO. During this time, he reunited with his former Big Wreck bandmate, Brian Doherty, to resurrect the group. They then began work on a new album entitled Albatross, which was released on March 6, 2012. His group toured around Canada as Big Wreck from April to July 2012. The album "Albatross" debuted at No. 5 on the Canadian Albums Chart. This is the highest peak position ever for Big Wreck or Ian Thornley on the Canadian Albums Chart.

On February 5, Big Wreck performed at the Sound Academy in Toronto for Canada's Official Super Bowl XLVI party. They completed two tours in 2012 across Canada from BC to Ontario in the Spring/Summer (April to July), and later they joined Theory of a Deadman for the Jingle Bell Rock tour in the Fall/Winter of 2012 (November to December 2012).

The released their fourth studio album, Ghosts, in Canada on June 10, 2014, and in the US on July 15, 2014. The album has since been released in South Africa. The album debuted at #5 on the Canadian Albums Chart, selling 4,000 copies in its first week. The album also debuted at #4 on the Billboard Heatseekers chart, which is the band's highest position on that chart in their history.

Thornley released Secrets in October 2015.

Discography

Solo work (as Ian Fletcher Thornley)

Big Wreck

Thornley

Influences 

Aside from his obvious love for and influence by Chris Cornell, his early influences were "folk blues like country blues and acoustic styles", and later 
the electric blues of Buddy Guy.  At the age of 15, he got into rock and roll, but it was mellower, melodic rock like Supertramp.  He also cites Bruce Cockburn as an influence to his guitar playing.  Ian's first concert was Bruce Springsteen.  It was after that show that he knew that was exactly what he wanted to do.

References

External links
 https://www.facebook.com/ianfletcherthornley/

1972 births
Living people
Berklee College of Music alumni
Canadian rock singers
Canadian songwriters
Musicians from Toronto
Writers from Toronto
Canadian rock guitarists
Canadian male guitarists
Canadian alternative rock musicians
Alternative rock guitarists
21st-century Canadian guitarists
21st-century Canadian male singers
Big Dirty Band members
Thornley (band) members